Chochmat Nashim is an Israeli organisation that promotes women's rights in the Orthodox Jewish community in Israel and the United States. Their work aims to raise awareness of trends and policies within Orthodoxy that may harm women and girls. The group's activities include the establishment of a photo bank which includes the images of Orthodox women, and the use of satirical publications which mimic Jewish Torah study aimed at educating Orthodox men about the unequal treatment of Jewish women in religious divorce proceedings.

Activities 
The work of Chochmat Nashim focuses on contemporary social issues facing Orthodox Jewish women including divorce refusal under Jewish law, and the erasure of women from public spaces in Israel. The group also promotes public health information campaigns informing Haredi women of breast cancer treatments.

The group hosts a regular podcast on a range of topics featuring the Rachel Stomel, Anne Gordon, and the group's co-founder, Shoshanna Keats Jaskoll. The podcast is hosted and produced by Jewish Coffee House.

In 2021, Chochmat Nashim launched a photo bank project to alter the perceived Haredi norm which excludes Jewish women from public life. The photo bank project consists of stock photography of Orthodox women and seeks to address the issue of the erasure of women from Haredi and other Orthodox newspapers, magazines, and other publications. According to the group, the issue stems from a hyper-modesty that is not based on Jewish practice and contributes to the exclusion of Jewish women from policy making decisions. The project involved the use of over 200 Haredi and Orthodox volunteers and professionals, from the United States and Israel. The range of photos reflect the everyday lives of Orthodox and Haredi women. The stock photography produced in the project is managed by Chochmat Nashim for use by Jewish organizations, businesses, media outlets and advertisers based on a fee service model.

In 2021, the group launched a campaign ahead of the Israeli election for rabbinical judges which distributed satirical leaflets mimicking the religious study of the weekly Torah portion. The publication uses satire to highlight the inconsistencies in the ways in which rabbinic authority discovers legal solutions in many areas of Jewish life with the exception of the issue of "chained marriage" in which Jewish women in contemporary Jewish life are not disadvantaged in divorce proceedings under Orthodox religious law.

See also 
 Women in Israel
 Feminism in Israel
 Jewish Orthodox Feminist Alliance
 Kolech

References

External links 
 

Orthodox Jewish feminism
Jewish women's organizations